Berom or Birom may refer to:
 Berom people
 Berom language

Language and nationality disambiguation pages